Walton High School refers to:

United Kingdom
Walton High School, Milton Keynes, Buckinghamshire
Walton High School, Nelson, Lancashire
Walton High School, Stafford

United States
Walton High School (DeFuniak Springs, Florida)
George Walton Comprehensive High School in Cobb County, Georgia
Walton High School, Walton, Kansas, closed, merged with Newton High School (Kansas).
Walton High School (Bronx), New York

See also
South Walton High School, Walton County, Florida, United States
Walton-Verona High School, Walton, Kentucky, United States